Manjeet Chhillar (born 18 August 1986) is an Indian former professional kabaddi player who currently serves as the assistant coach of Telugu Titans. During his professional career, he played for the Indian national team and won a gold medal at the 2014 Asian Games and 2014 Asian Indoor Games in Incheon. He also played for teams in the Pro Kabaddi League including Bengaluru Bulls, Puneri Paltan, Jaipur Pink Panthers, Tamil Thalaivas, and Dabang Delhi. The Government of India conferred the Arjuna Award on him for his achievements in sports. In an exclusive chat with NNIS Sports, Chhillar termed it as a 'dream' to receive the prestigious award. He was also the member of state team of Haryana and is on top of Pro Kabaddi’s all-time leaderboards for tackle points (391), successful tackles (374) and High 5s (25).

Early life 
He was born in Nizampur village in West Delhi near Ghevra metro station. Manjeet Chhillar was initially a wrestler, but an injury to his nose saw him return to his village where he started playing Kabaddi. Manjeet was first seen in professional Kabaddi in the 2010 Asian Games in China.

Pro Kabaddi League

Season 1 

He was the captain of Bengaluru Bulls in the first season of VIVO Pro Kabaddi and won them a grand total of 51 tackle points – the highest by any defender – to emerge as the Star Sports Defender of the Tournament. Manjeet’s versatility meant that he also picked up 71 raid points and helped the Bulls reach the semi-finals.

Season 2 

Manjeet was adjudged Most Valuable Player (MVP) in Season 2 for his all-round performance. He picked up 40 tackle points and 67 raid points as Bengaluru Bulls finished as runners-up. Like the first season, Manjeet contributed heavily in attack for Bengaluru. Having said that, his defensive displays were top class as well and justifies him being MVP in Season 2.

Season 3 

He moved to Puneri Paltan ahead of the third season and was made captain. His performance levels though didn’t drop as he scored 61 tackle points and 45 raid points while leading Pune to a third-placed finish in what was their best season.

Season 4 

The fourth edition of Pro Kabaddi saw both Manjeet and Pune fail to better their performance from the previous campaign. He scored only 44 tackle points and 24 raid points as Pune narrowly missed out on the playoffs.

Season 5 

In Season 5, Manjeet joined Jaipur Pink Panthers and was made captain again. However, he could manage just 5 raid points and 47 tackle points as the Panthers endured a difficult campaign that saw Manjeet nurse an injury for a long duration.

Season 6 

In Season 6, he moved to Tamil Thalaivas after the Tamil Nadu based franchise picked him. Manjeet became a leader in defence for the Thalaivas and scored 59 tackle points as well as 8 raid points.

Season 7 
In season 7, Manjeet continued at Tamil Thalaivas, scoring 37 tackle points and 4 raid points.

Season 8 
Manjeet was bought by Dabang Delhi in the auction for Rs 20 lakh and helped the team win its maiden title. In season 8, he scored 52 tackle points from 24 games.

At the end of the season, he retired and became the assistant coach of Telugu Titans.

International 
Manjeet is a gold medalist in the National Championships in 2010, 2011 and 2012. He has also won gold at the 2009 Asian Indoor Games and the 2010 Asian Games. Manjeet claimed bronze at the 2012 Asian Beach Games.

Records and achievements

 Most Valuable Player (2015) in the PKL
 Gold at 2010 Asian Games in Guangzhou
 Gold at 2014 Asian Games in Incheon
 2016 Kabaddi World Cup winner
 2018 Dubai Kabaddi Masters winner
 Arjuna Award winner (2015)

References 

Indian kabaddi players
Living people
People from Panipat district
Kabaddi players from Haryana
Pro Kabaddi League players
Recipients of the Arjuna Award
Asian Games gold medalists for India
Asian Games medalists in kabaddi
Kabaddi players at the 2010 Asian Games
Kabaddi players at the 2014 Asian Games
1986 births
Medalists at the 2010 Asian Games
Medalists at the 2014 Asian Games